Benjamin Louis "Ben" Raimondi (January 23, 1925 – April 16, 2020) was a professional American football player for the All-America Football Conference's New York Yankees. He played quarterback in seven games during the 1947 season.  Raimondi played college football at William & Mary and then Indiana.

References

External links
Photograph of Raimondi while at Indiana

1925 births
2020 deaths
American football quarterbacks
Erasmus Hall High School alumni
Indiana Hoosiers football players
New York Yankees (AAFC) players
Sportspeople from Brooklyn
Players of American football from New York City
William & Mary Tribe football players